László Szögi (born 20 June 1972) is a Hungarian rower. He competed in the men's single sculls event at the 1996 Summer Olympics.

References

1972 births
Living people
Hungarian male rowers
Olympic rowers of Hungary
Rowers at the 1996 Summer Olympics
Sportspeople from Szeged